Borve may refer to places otherwise known as "Borgh":

Villages in Scotland:
Borve, Barra
Borve, Harris
Borve, Lewis
Borve, Skye
Borve, North Uist

Castles in Scotland:
Borve Castle, Benbecula
Borve Castle, Sutherland

See also
Borge (disambiguation)